"Pure Imagination" is a song from the 1971 film Willy Wonka & the Chocolate Factory. It was written by British composers Leslie Bricusse and Anthony Newley specifically for the movie. It was sung by Gene Wilder who played the character of Willy Wonka. Bricusse has stated that the song was written over the phone in one day. The song has a spoken introduction.

Since its release, the song has been covered and remixed hundreds of times by a wide variety of artists. The original song was not popular when it was first released. The film itself was not a blockbuster and other songs from the soundtrack performed better. It was not until the movie began appearing on television reruns in the 1980s that the film and "Pure Imagination" become more well known. Although the original song never charted, some cover versions have done so.

In the week following Wilder's death in 2016, the song rose in streams and sales by more than 1000%. The song was featured in television, radio, and social media tributes to Wilder.

Notable cover versions
In September 2013, the song was featured in a Chipotle short film, sung by Fiona Apple. (US No. 104).
Ruby Arias (portrayed by Emma Tremblay) sang the song for a school concert in the Supergirl episode, "The Faithful".
An instrumental version of the song is featured in the 2017 Marvel Studios film Thor: Ragnarok.
The Chainsmokers sample the song and interpolate the chorus lyrics in "Testing" a song off their fourth studio album So Far So Good. 
Jamie Cullum did a cover of Pure Imagination in the album Momentum, released in May of 2013.

References

External links
Lyrics and guitar chords of "Pure Imagination"

1971 songs
Willy Wonka
Chocolate industry
Buckethead songs
Songs written by Leslie Bricusse
Songs written by Anthony Newley
Songs written for films